Yug is an Indian Hindi-language television series that was telecast on DD National from September 1996 to November 1997.

Yug was a fictional series depicting the story of Indian freedom fighters and their struggle to win freedom for India. The series was produced and directed by Sunil Agnihotri and had notable actors such as Hema Malini, Ashwini Bhave, Pankaj Dheer, Shahbaz Khan, Mukesh Khanna, Vinod Kapoor, Javed Khan, Sudesh Berry and Abhimanyu Singh.

Plot
Nirmala is the eldest daughter of Rai Bahadur Dina Nath. Mother of Nirmala and Rukmani nourish the dream of putting an end to the tyranny of the foreign rulers of the country. The rulers have adopted clandestine designs of divide and rule, virtually divided the entire society into privileged (favorites of the rulers) and under privileged (poor and ignored). Nirmala's father, Dina Nath, belongs to this elite privileged lot having been groomed thoroughly pro-British. Nirmala decides to devote her prime youth for the struggle to end this injustice to Indians and follows Gandhi's ideology. Her younger sister Rukmani is a revolutionary and is an ardent follower of Netaji Subash Chander Bose's ideas of action to achieve fundamental rights to end slavery. Both the sisters strive secretly for a common goal in different ways.

Rukmani meets Ali Khan who is a revolutionary and in police custody. She rescues him in a well planned daring encounter with police while Ali Khan was being secretly shifted from one jail to another. This feat earned her a great respect and trust to become an important member of the revolutionary party. Ranjit of Bengal is a pivotal force who circumvents the powerful British intelligence and further manipulates the gathered information to the advantage of the revolutionary party. He uses his influences to motivate the common people to join in the struggle to end the rule of tyranny.

On the intellectual side there are two contrasting lawyers;

Darshan Lal who has studied law in England and opted to sacrifice a promising future for the freedom of his motherland. He was deported to Kala Pani (an isolated jail in an island in the Bay of Bengal) and could manage to jump from the ship.

Advocate P.C Das a prominent and charismatic ace lawyer who fights fiercely for the rights of his clients, religion no bound. He is known to be generous and fair and hold an unwavering fervour for his country and countrymen.

Further, The tiger of Punjab, Kartar Singh represented the strong nationalistic emotions of brave Punjabis. All sorts of tortures tried on him in Kala Pani could not deter him from pursuing the ultimate goal of freedom from slavery of India. His determination served as a role model to all the revolutionaries. He meticulously planned the elimination of the obstacles and always considered all the British as his enemy number one. He was ably helped in his missions by his capable dedicated daughter Vidya.

Sarojini Sen a socialite of Bengal who moves in high circles of British Government is a sympathizer of the movement and becomes very handy for small favors from government officials.

A British Superintendent of Police Peter Gomes is a terror. Being Anglo Indian, he considers himself British. He is cruel toward freedom fighters. He is loyal to the British Raj.

A notorious dacoit Bhima ruled an area with terror of his gun, accidentally meets revolutionary Veeru who gradually prevailed upon him to channel his might towards the life giving stream – freedom, rather than his present profession of killing the innocent countrymen. He subsequently became a firebrand revolutionary.

The dedicated untiring efforts of the above few brave heroes along with the participation of thousands of countrymen directly and indirectly could put an end to colonialism.

Cast

 Dara Singh as Kartar Singh
 Hema Malini as Nirmala
 Ashwini Bhave as Rukmani
 Mukesh Khanna as Darshan Lal
 Pankaj Dheer as Ali Khan
 Shahbaz Khan as Virendra (Veeru) Singh
 Vindu Dara Singh as Bheema Daaku
 Arjun as Peter Gomes 'The Killer'
 Javed Khan as Advocate P.C. Das
 Vinod Kapoor as Ranjit Basu
 Reena Wadhwa as Ratna / Nirmala's daughter in episode 1
 Nimai Bali as Hazaari
 Deepraj Rana as Deva
 Aasif Sheikh as Hasrat Nurani
 Sunil Bob Gadhawali as Hamilton
 Brownie Parashar as John Dorno
 Priya Tendulkar as Suhasini Journalist
 Shikha Swaroop as Professor Anjali 
 Abhimanyu Singh as Commissioner Sahib
 Neena Gupta as Lady Lawyer
 Mamik Singh as Arjun Singh
 Asrani as Jailor
 Fateh Khan as Anwar Fateh Haan
 Sudesh Berry as Virendra Gupta
 Pradeep Rawat as Marshal
 Anil Nagrath as Thakur
 Shehzad Khan as Thakur Vikram Singh
 Tom Alter as Maulana Abul Kalam Azad
 Saurabh Dubey as Muhammad Ali Jinnah
 Prabha Sinha
 Aashish Kaul
 Pramod Kapoor
 Tarun Shukla
 Dinesh Ojha
 Devdutt
 Santosh Gupta
 Ikram Khan
 Anil Tyagi
  Madhu Bharti
 Adi Irani
 R.S.Chopra
 Suresh Chatwal
 Ashok Banthiya
 Krutika Desai as Vidya
 Kiran Juneja as Durga
 Sonu Walia as British Girl
 Seema Kapoor as Krantikar
 Durga Jasraj as Sikh Girl (Krantikari)
 Sudha Chandran as Sakina: Ali Khan's sister
 Kalpana Iyer as Sarojini Sen
 Asha Sharma as Rukmini and Nirmala's mother 
 Amita Nangia as Royal Family
 Neelam Mehra as Beg. Nafiza
 Kamia Malhotra as Nazima
 Fatima Sheikh as Gandhian
 Sulabha Deshpande as Mad Revolutionary Villager
 Deepak Parashar as Gandhian Amar Singh
 Deep Dhillon as SP of Cobra
 Mangal Dhillon as Raja Thakur
 AK Hangal as Gandhian Leader
 Ajit Vachani as D.M.
 Amit Behl as Jay Dutt (lawyer of coalmine worker)
 Arun Bali as Dina Nath Rai Bahadur
 Bharat Kapoor as Congress leader 
 Brahamchari as Doctor supporter of freedom fighter
 Gajendra Chauhan as District Magistrate
 Girja Shankar as Goverdhan Chaturvedi (Krantikari)
 Mohan Kapur as Tejpal (supporter of Subhash Chandra Bose)
 Dipesh Shah as Bapu-Mahatma Gandhi
 Anand Balraj as Andy Gomes
 Goga Kapoor as Governor
 Paintal as British owner of coal mines 
 Prithavi as Viceroy 
 Rajeev Verma as Krishna Kant Sahay (Congress leader)
 Raj Kira as Maulana Nausar Ali (Congress leader) 
 Raza Murad as Khalil Rahman (Lawyers of Netaji)
 Sudhir Mittoo as Commander Burton 
 Sudhir Dalvi as Masterjee (Gandhian)
 Vijendra Ghatge as Raja Rajendra Singh

References

External links
 

1996 Indian television series debuts
DD National original programming
Indian television soap operas
1998 Indian television series endings
Indian independence movement fiction
Television shows set in the British Raj
Cultural depictions of Muhammad Ali Jinnah